Homoeomeria is a genus of moths in the subfamily Lymantriinae. The genus was erected by Hans Daniel Johan Wallengren in 1865.

Species
Some species of this genus are:

Homoeomeria cretosa (Saalmüller, 1884)
Homoeomeria euryptena Collenette, 1960
Homoeomeria flavicapilla (Wallengren, 1860)
Homoeomeria haploa Collenette, 1958
Homoeomeria hololeuca (Hampson, 1910)
Homoeomeria hypsoides Collenette, 1960
Homoeomeria iroceraea (Collenette, 1959)
Homoeomeria nivea Aurivillius, 1909

References

Lymantriinae